Koiak 4 - Coptic Calendar - Koiak 6

The fifth day of the Coptic month of Koiak, the fourth month of the Coptic year. On a common year, this day corresponds to December 1, of the Julian Calendar, and December 14, of the Gregorian Calendar. This day falls in the Coptic season of Peret, the season of emergence. This day falls in the Nativity Fast.

Commemorations

Saints 

 The departure of Nahum, the Prophet
 The martyrdom of Saint Victor of Assiut 
 The martyrdom of Saint Isidore

References 

Days of the Coptic calendar